County Center/Little Italy station is an at-grade station on the Blue Line and Green Line of the San Diego Trolley system. It is located along the Surf Line right of way between West Beech Street and West Cedar Street, in the Little Italy neighborhood of Downtown San Diego. The area has a variety of medium and high-density housing, and is also the site of the County Center, the location of many buildings for the Government of San Diego County.

County Center/Little Italy station opened on July 2, 1992 and served as the northern terminus for the North/South Line (later renamed the Blue Line) until the line was extended to Old Town Transit Center in June 1996. This station was closed from August 6 to October 14, 2012, for renovations as part of the Trolley Renewal Project.

Station layout
There are four tracks, two for the trolley station and two passing tracks for commuter, intercity, and BNSF freight service.

See also
 List of San Diego Trolley stations

References

Blue Line (San Diego Trolley)
Green Line (San Diego Trolley)
Railway stations in the United States opened in 1996
San Diego Trolley stations in San Diego
1996 establishments in California